The British Virgin Islands competed at the 2022 Commonwealth Games in Birmingham, England between 28 July – 8 August 2022. It was the team's ninth appearance at the Games.

The British Virgin Islands team consisted of 19 athletes (ten men and nine women) competing in four sports. Rikkoi Brathwaite and Beyoncé Defreitas were the country's flagbearers during the opening ceremony.

Medalists

Competitors
The following is the list of number of competitors participating at the Games per sport/discipline.

Athletics

A squad of eleven athletes was announced on 11 July 2022.

Men
Track and road events

Field events

Women
Track and road events

Field events

3x3 basketball

Saint Lucia, the top Commonwealth Caribbean federation in the FIBA 3x3 Federation Rankings for women (on 1 November 2021), declined their invitation to play in the women's tournament. As the next-highest ranked Caribbean federation, the British Virgin Islands received the reallocated invitation.

Four players were announced on 11 July 2022.

Summary

Women's tournament

Roster
Shauliqua Fahie
Mahkayla Pickering
Keithrece Smith
Joy Victor

Group play

Cycling

Two cyclists were announced on 11 July 2022.

Road
Men

Squash

Two players were announced on 11 July 2022.

References

External links
British Virgin Islands Olympic Committee Official site

Nations at the 2022 Commonwealth Games
British Virgin Islands at the Commonwealth Games
2022 in British Virgin Islands sport